This is a list of election results for the electoral district of Edwardstown in South Australian elections.

Members for Edwardstown

Election results

Elections in the 1960s

Elections in the 1950s

 Two party preferred vote was estimated.

References

South Australian state electoral results by district